Jane & Gerry Swan Track at Rotary Stadium is a fully lighted, multi-purpose stadium located in Abbotsford, British Columbia. It features a rubberized 400 metre running track ("Jane & Gerry Swan Track") with wide turns and full field event facilities. The grandstand contains 4,000 seats (3,000 covered).

Rotary Stadium is the home of the Valley Royals Track & Field Club, the Fraser Valley Venom (Rugby Canada Super League), and the Abbotsford Falcons (Football Club).

The Valley Royals and Rotary Stadium are lasting legacies of the efforts by Jane and Gerry Swan; shortly after Jane's death in 2004, the city of Abbotsford renamed Rotary Stadium as Jane & Gerry Swan Track, in recognition of their contributions to the sport of athletics and the Abbotsford community as a whole. Over the years, the Valley Royals have hosted many prestigious events at Jane & Gerry Swan Track at Rotary Stadium (see Valley Royals Track & Field Club).

For the past few years, the stadium and neighbouring fields have been used for BC Lions training camp activities.

Rotary Stadium is part of Abbotsford Exhibition Park, a  park located in the heart of Abbotsford. The park will be undergoing a revitalization project based on the Exhibition Park Master Plan.

References

External links
 Satellite view of Exhibition Stadium on Google Maps
 Facility Records - Jane & Gerry Swan Track at Rotary Stadium

Athletics (track and field) venues in Canada
Buildings and structures in Abbotsford, British Columbia
Canadian football venues in British Columbia
Multi-purpose stadiums in British Columbia
Rugby union stadiums in British Columbia
Soccer venues in British Columbia
Sports venues in British Columbia
Sports venues completed in 1986
1986 establishments in British Columbia